Let's Do It! India (LDII) is the International Environmental Organization founded by Pankaj Choudhary in 2016. It has more than 2.2 Million active volunteers all across the country. Let's Do It! India encourages people all across the world to participate in local, governmental, and international cleanup efforts. The foundation is the Indian chapter of Let's Do It! World. It is a section 8 non profit company registered under India's company's act with required 12A and 80G section.

The organization works in the fields of education, environment, healthcare, human resource development, etc.

Let's Do It India is aiming to raise awareness of the many types of garbage. In 2020 the organization launched a campaign 'Pickup Cigarette Butts!' on World Cleanup Day. It encourages people to gather and send their used cigarette filters to the group for recycling.

In 2020, National Green Tribunal (India) has instructed Central Pollution Control Board (CPCB) to develop rules for the disposal of bidi residues and cigarette butts. In the same year Let's Do It India started a campaign of colleting cigarette butts and bidi residues under the guidelines of Central Pollution Control Board. This movement is supported by the International organizations like UN-Habitat, United Nations Environment Programme and Earth Day Network. The organization collects tons of garbage on world cleanup day each year.

In 2022, a MoU was signed between Ministry of Water Resources, River Development and Ganga Rejuvenation and Let's Do It India.

With the help of more than 30,000 volunteers, the HCL Foundation and Let's Do It India organization held World Cleanup Day 2022 at Noida, India.

Awards and honors
In January 2023, Let’s Do It, India received the award for “Best Environmental Organization for promoting SEEP (Sustainable, Environmental, Educational Programme)” from the President Of Estonia Alar Karis at Tallinn, Estonia.

See also 
World Cleanup Day

References 

Charities based in India
Organizations established in 2016
2016 establishments in India